Beaumont Hannant (born c. 1970) is a British musician, producer and DJ from York, England. His work includes ambient techno, IDM, hip hop and indie rock.  Hannant has received positive critical reviews, and he was named one of "The Faces of '94" by music magazine Select.

Biography
Hannant became a hip-hop/electro DJ in 1986, after witnessing the 1986 World Mixing Championships. During 1993–1994, he released several solo albums on General Production Recordings rooted in ambient techno. His music from this period has been described as eclectic, densely layered and textured.

Hannant's album Texturology (1994) resulted in a top three independent album chart placing. Music from the album was used in a theatre presentation of the 17th-century play The Traitor.

By 1994, Hannant began to diversify. He provided remixes for Autechre, Björk and Ned's Atomic Dustbin, produced Lida Husik (who provided the vocals to some of his compositions) and managed Shed Seven. With his long-term engineer Richard Brown, Hannant started the trip hop duo Outcast, signing to the indie label One Little Indian in 1996.

Discography
Releases
All on General Production Recordings
 1993: Tastes and Textures, Vol. 1 (EP)
 1993: Tastes and Textures, Vol. 2: Basic Data Manipulation (CD and double LP)
 1994: Tastes and Textures, Vol. 3 (EP)
 1994: Texturology (CD and double LP)
 1994: Texturology [Vol. 2] (limited additional double LP)
 1994: Ormeau (single)
 1994: Sculptured (CD and double LP)
 1994: Bitter Sweet (recorded as YO3 alias)
 1995: Psi-Onyx (EP)
 1995: Notions of Tonality, Vol. 1 (EP)
 1996: Notions of Tonality, Vol. 2 (EP)
The cover of Notions of Tonality, Vol. 2 mentions a forthcoming album, Tones, but General Production Recordings folded before it could be released, and the album never surfaced.

Appearances include
 1994: "Utuba" on Artificial Intelligence II
 1996: Green Blue Fire album by Husikesque

Remixes include
 1994: "Beaumonthannanttwomx" and "12/4cadetmx" on Basscadet EP by Autechre
 1995: Two remixes of "All I Ask of Myself Is That I Hold Together" and two remixes of "Premonition" by Ned's Atomic Dustbin
 1995: Three remixes of "Hyperballad" by Björk: "Girls Blouse Mix", "Over the Edge Mix" and "Subtle Abuse Mix"

References

External links
 
 Beaumont Hannant interview
 Hyperreal Music Archive
 

Living people
Year of birth missing (living people)
English DJs
English electronic musicians
Electronic dance music DJs